Doro may refer to:

 Doro (musician), rock singer, former vocalist of the German heavy metal band Warlock
 Doro (album), a 1990 album by Doro
 AKA (rapper) (born 1988), South African hip hop recording artist
 Dorothy Bush Koch, often called "Doro", daughter of US President George H. W. Bush
 Doro (company), a Swedish telecommunications company
 The Doro, another name for the BT Inspiration telephone PBX
 Doro, the bodiless, godlike character who designs a selective breeding program that spans centuries in the Patternist series of novels by Octavia E. Butler
 DoRo Productions, a film company based in Austria, formerly known for their music videos
 , a Panamanian cargo ship in service 1951–1956
 Doro, South Sudan

See also
Toro (disambiguation)

ja:ドロ